The General Counsel of the Army (also known as the Army General Counsel, abbreviated AGC) is the chief legal officer of the U.S. Department of the Army and senior legal advisor to the Secretary of the Army.

U.S. law provides that the General Counsel shall be appointed from the civilian life by the President of the United States, with the advice and consent of the United States Senate, and that the Secretary of the Army prescribes the duties of the office.

The Office of the General Counsel of the Army also provides legal advice to the Under Secretary of the Army and the five Assistant Secretaries of the Army, as well as other members of the Army Secretariat.  The General Counsel of the Army also plays a role in supervising the Office of the Judge Advocate General and the Office of the Chief Counsel of the United States Army Corps of Engineers.

Partial list of General Counsels of the Army

See also
 General Counsel of the Department of Defense
 General Counsel of the Department of the Air Force
 General Counsel of the Navy

References

External links
 Office of the General Counsel

 
Lawyers who have represented the United States government